"Forgiven" is the fifth single from the Dutch symphonic metal band Within Temptation's fourth album The Heart of Everything. It was released to promote their upcoming DVD, Black Symphony as well as being a single from the album. The song itself is a piano driven ballad with orchestral elements.

Music video
The video for "Forgiven" is similar to that of "Jillian (I'd Give My Heart)," which is made up of footage of The Silent Force Tour. "Forgiven" features highlights of Black Symphony, which is based on the fact that "Forgiven" is a promotional single for the concert DVD. As there is a radio edit of the song, the music video portrays only the edit rather than the full-length version.

Formats and track listings
These are the formats and track listings of major single releases of "Forgiven".

5-track digipack single
"Forgiven" (single version)
"Forgiven" (album version)
"The Howling" (Live at Beursgebouw Eindhoven 23-11-2007)
"Hand of Sorrow" (Live at Beursgebouw Eindhoven 23-11-2007)
"The Heart of Everything" (Live at Beursgebouw Eindhoven 23-11-2007)

A single containing only the first two tracks was planned, but eventually not released.

Charts

References

2008 singles
2007 songs
Within Temptation songs
Songs written by Sharon den Adel
Songs written by Robert Westerholt
Songs written by Martijn Spierenburg
Heavy metal ballads